is a Japanese voice actress from Saitama Prefecture, Japan.

Biography

Filmography

Television animation
.hack//Legend of the Twilight - Female Heavy Blade
.hack//SIGN - Kao-chin
D.N.Angel - Riku Harada
Gegege no Kitaro (1996) - Megumi
Gegege no Kitaro (2007) - Yobuko
Green Green - Midori Chitose
The Melancholy of Haruhi Suzumiya - Mai Zaizen
Sailor Moon Supers - Kyokumadanko (129), Ayatoriko (139), Autobiko (142), Elephanko (146), GaraGara-musume (150)
Spice and Wolf - Helena
One Piece - Porche
Yumeria - Kuyou Senjyou

Original video animation (OVA)
Alien Nine - Miyu Tamaki

Films
Futari wa Pretty Cure Max Heart - Pear
Gegege no Kitaro: Daikaijuu - Megumi

Video games
Other Life: Azure Dreams - Vivian Merca
Room with Lina - Lina Kanzaki
Shadow Hearts - Yoshiko Kawashima
Super Dodge Ball - Angela
Tales of Legendia - Pippo
Yumeria - Kuyou Senjou
Rakugaki Showtime - Ex Calibur

Tokusatsu
Tokusou Sentai Dekaranger - Ocarnaian Amy (12)

Dubbing
Speed 2: Cruise Control - Drew (Christine Firkins)

References

External links
 
Sara Nakayama at Ryu's Seiyuu Infos

1974 births
Living people
Aoni Production voice actors
Japanese video game actresses
Japanese voice actresses
Voice actresses from Saitama Prefecture
20th-century Japanese actresses
21st-century Japanese actresses